Valérie Six (born 11 January 1963) is a French politician from the UDI who was the National Assembly deputy for Nord's 7th constituency from 2020 to 2022.

She lost her seat in the first round of the 2022 French legislative election.

References 

1963 births
Living people
Deputies of the 15th National Assembly of the French Fifth Republic
Union of Democrats and Independents politicians
Women members of the National Assembly (France)
21st-century French women politicians
21st-century French politicians

People from Seclin
Candidates for the 2022 French legislative election